The Branscombe Automobile Machine Shop, located at 125 West Commercial in Anaconda, Montana, was built in 1916. It was listed on the National Register of Historic Places in 2000. It has also been known as Brewery Antiques & Western Montana Fur Center.

It is a two-story, brick, rectangular Early Commercial-style building. It has a stepped parapet wall and brick pilasters defining each of its three bays on front facade and five bays of length. It had the first substantial freight elevator in Anaconda.

References

This photo is East of the existing building by 2 city blocks, this has NEVER been where this building is! 

National Register of Historic Places in Deer Lodge County, Montana
Early Commercial architecture in the United States
Commercial buildings completed in 1916
1916 establishments in Montana
Anaconda, Montana